Jiske Griffioen defeated Aniek van Koot in the final, 6–0, 6–2 to win the women's singles wheelchair tennis title at the 2015 French Open.

Yui Kamiji was the defending champion, but was defeated in the semifinals by van Koot in a rematch of the previous year's final.

Seeds

Draw

Finals

References
 Draw

Wheelchair Women's Singles
French Open, 2015 Women's Singles